Nina Kessler (born 4 July 1988) is a Dutch racing cyclist, who currently rides for UCI Women's WorldTeam . She competed in the 2013 UCI women's team time trial in Florence. At the 2015 Dutch National Track Championships she became Dutch champion in the women's Madison together with Kirsten Wild. She won the points classification at the 2016 La Course by Le Tour de France.

Major results

Track

2006
 2nd Keirin, National Track Championships
2007
 3rd Keirin, National Track Championships
2008
 National Track Championships
2nd Keirin
3rd Points race
2010
 National Track Championships
3rd Keirin
3rd Madison (with Winanda Spoor)
2014
 National Track Championships
2nd Madison (with Nicky Zijlaard)
3rd Points race
2015
 1st  Madison, National Track Championships (with Kirsten Wild)
2016
 National Track Championships
1st  Omnium
1st  Madison (with Kirsten Wild)
 3rd  Madison, UEC European Track Championships (with Kirsten Wild)
2017
 1st  Madison, National Track Championships (with Kirsten Wild)

Road

2012
 7th Overall Belgium Tour
2013
 5th EPZ Omloop van Borsele
 10th 7-Dorpenomloop Aalburg
2014
 3rd Ronde van Overijssel
 4th Erondegemse Pijl
 7th 7-Dorpenomloop Aalburg
 8th Grand Prix de Dottignies
 9th Ronde van Gelderland
 9th EPZ Omloop van Borsele
 9th Dwars door de Westhoek
 9th Diamond Tour
 10th Overall BeNe Ladies Tour
 10th Gent–Wevelgem
2015
 2nd Road race, South Holland Provincial Road Championships
 3rd Erondegemse Pijl
 4th Omloop van de IJsseldelta
2016
 2nd Erondegemse Pijl
 2nd RideLondon Classique
 4th Omloop van Borsele
 6th Ronde van Gelderland
 7th 7-Dorpenomloop Aalburg
 8th Overall BeNe Ladies Tour
1st Stage 2a
2017
 1st Diamond Tour
 4th Omloop van de IJsseldelta
 5th Erondegemse Pijl
 6th Telkom 947 Cycle Challenge
 6th Omloop van Borsele
 6th Drentse Acht van Westerveld
2018
 1st Erondegemse Pijl
 5th Overall The Princess Maha Chackri Sirindhorn's Cup "Women's Tour of Thailand"
 5th 7-Dorpenomloop Aalburg 
 6th Omloop Het Nieuwsblad
 6th Flanders Ladies Classic
 7th Le Samyn des Dames
 7th Veenendaal–Veenendaal Classic
 8th Diamond Tour
 9th Overall Tour of Zhoushan Island
2019
 4th Overall Tour of Chongming Island
1st  Mountains classification
2021
 10th Ronde van Drenthe
2022
 3rd Omloop der Kempen
 8th Ronde van Drenthe

Mountain biking

2014
 3rd Beach race, National Mountain Bike Championships
2015
 2nd Beach race, National Mountain Bike Championships
2019
 1st  Beach race, UEC European Mountain Bike Championships
2020
 2nd Beach race, National Mountain Bike Championships
2022
 1st Beach race, National Mountain Bike Championships
2023
 1st Beach race, National Mountain Bike Championships

See also
2013 Boels Dolmans Cycling Team season
2014 Boels Dolmans Cycling Team season

References

External links
 
 

1988 births
Living people
Dutch female cyclists
Dutch track cyclists
People from Breukelen
Cyclists from Utrecht (province)
20th-century Dutch women
21st-century Dutch women